Palo-Alto is a barangay in Calamba, Laguna in the Philippines. It is located south of Mayapa, west of Barandal, south-east of Majada Out, and northeast of Laguerta.

Sitios and Puroks 
 Highland One
 Highland Two
 Kasikuhan 
 Manggahan
 Palo-Alto

Subdivisions 
 Bay Hill 
 Hacienda Hill
 Maresco 
 Oak Hill 
 Pacific Hill
 Palm Hill 
 Phirst Park Homes
 Saint Francisco Heights 
 Southwynds Residences
 Highlands 1
 Highlands 2
 Camella - Lessandra

Education 
 Palo Alto Care Center
 Palo Alto Elementary School
 Palo Alto Integrated School
 Golden Wisdom School of Calamba Inc.
 Holy Redeemer School of Calamba, Laguna Inc.
 Twin Stars School of Calamba Inc.

Demography

References

External links
 Official Website of the Provincial Government of Laguna

Barangays of Calamba, Laguna